Liberia competed at the 1960 Summer Olympics in Rome, Italy. They had four athletes, of whom all competed in Athletics.

Athletics

Key
Note–Ranks given for track events are within the athlete's heat only
Q = Qualified for the next round
q = Qualified for the next round as a fastest loser or, in field events, by position without achieving the qualifying target
N/A = Round not applicable for the event
Bye = Athlete not required to compete in round

Men
Track & road events

References
Official Olympic Reports

Nations at the 1960 Summer Olympics
1960
1960 in Liberian sport